The 1970–71 Spartan League season was the 53rd in the history of Spartan League. The league consisted of 18 teams.

League table

The division featured 18 teams, 17 from last season and 1 new team:
 Bracknell Town, from Surrey Senior League

References

1970–71
9